Richmond Hill GO Station is a train and bus station in the GO Transit network located in Richmond Hill, Ontario, Canada. It was the northern terminus of the Richmond Hill line train service from the service's inception in 1982 until the opening of Gormley GO Station on December 5, 2016.

Of all the Richmond Hill line stations, this is the only station that has a reduced length platform which accommodates only up to an L8 consist, a trainset consisting of eight Bombardier BiLevel Coaches and at least one locomotive. Beginning in the spring of 2015, the platform was scheduled to be extended to allow 12-car trains. A pedestrian bridge over Major Mackenzie Drive was built, and a new station building was planned but has not been built. The train layover facility in Richmond Hill was opened in 2014.

History

The original Richmond Hill railway station was a single storey clapboard building, located on the north side of Centre Street East, just a short distance north of the current station.  Built in 1906 by the James Bay Railway, the station was closed by Canadian National Railway in 1968 and the building was relocated in 1979 to Richmond Green, at Elgin Mills Road and Leslie Street, to serve as a clubhouse for local minor soccer teams.

The Richmond Hill GO Station will become a terminus for the planned Viva Silver buses, once that service begins operation in 2022.

Connecting buses
York Region Transit:
4 Major Mackenzie (West)
25 Major Mackenzie (East)
82 Valleymede
86 Newkirk-Red Maple

GO Transit:
61 Bloomington GO Station to Union Station Bus Terminal

References

External links

Railway stations in Richmond Hill, Ontario
GO Transit railway stations
Railway stations in Canada opened in 1978
1978 establishments in Ontario